Desson Patrick Thomson is a former speechwriter for the Obama administration and former film critic for The Washington Post. He was known as Desson Howe until 2003 when he changed his name after reuniting with his birth father.

Biography
Thomson attended American University from 1975 until 1979, graduating in Spring 1980 with a degree in visual communications and cinema studies. He started working for The Washington Post in 1983 as a copy aide for the Style section, and by 1984 was writing freelance articles for the paper. In 1987 he became a film critic for the paper. He wrote one of the few negative reviews of multiple Academy award nominated movie The Shawshank Redemption. In his review of Groundhog Day, he infamously stated that the film "will never be designated a national film treasure by the Library of Congress." Thirteen years later, the film would be inducted into the Library of Congress.

Thomson left the Washington Post in 2008, and in 2010 became a speechwriter in the administration of President Barack Obama. From February 2010 until November 2010 he was stationed in London working for the U.S. Ambassador to the United Kingdom, Louis Susman. In December 2010, he joined the Policy Planning Office of the U.S. Department of State as a speechwriter for Secretary of State Hillary Clinton. In February 2012, he became a speechwriter and Senior Advisor for Content Development for the Under Secretary of State for Public Diplomacy and Public Affairs. Until September 2017 he was a speechwriter and senior advisor for Charles H. Rivkin, Assistant Secretary of State for Economic and Business Affairs.

References

The Washington Post people
American University School of Communication alumni
American film critics
Living people
1958 births
20th-century American journalists
20th-century American male writers
21st-century American journalists
21st-century American male writers
American male journalists
American speechwriters
People from Surrey
English emigrants to the United States